Family Pride is the name of:

 Family Pride, the British soap opera.
 The previous name of the Family Equality Council.
 Family Pride Canada, a Canadian organization advocating for family equality for LGBT parents.